The Wild Fields is a film based on Serhiy Zhadan’s novel “Voroshylovhrad”. Its genre is eastern. The film was developed by LIMELITE Production in collaboration with TV Channel “Ukraine”, Media Group Ukraine, Ukrainian State Film Agency (Derzhkino) and a Swiss production studio “Film Brut”.

The film was released in wide distribution in Ukraine on 9 November 2018.

The screen version of Serhiy Zhadan's novel has already won The Connecting Cottubs Best Pitch Award 2016, The Connecting Cottubs Producers Network Award 2016, The Connecting Cottubs Pitch Award 2017 and The Connecting Cottubs Work-In-Progress Award 2017.

Plot 
The protagonist, Herman has to come back to his native Donbas after years spent away. He has to look into the case of his brother's sudden disappearance. Herman meets real and unreal characters, his childhood friends and the local mafia. And suddenly, to his own surprise, he decides to stay in his native town with people who love and believe him and need his defense.

Original source: novel "Voroshylovhrad" 
The plot of the tape is based on the novel by Serhiy Zhadan "Voroshylovhrad". However, the director Yaroslav Lodyhin and the author of the original source Serhiy Zhadan agreed before the filming of the tape that the book and the film should be delimited, since these are two different types of works, and the book "should be left behind."

Cast 
 Oleg Moskalenko - Herman
 Volodymyr Yamnenko - Kocha
 Oleksiy Gorbunov - Pastor
 Ruslana Khazipova  - Olya
 George Povolotsky - Travma
 Eugenia Muts - Nikolai Nikolaevich
 Igor Portyanko - cameo

Production

Estimate 
The cost of the film was 1 million 100 thousand euros, 1 million 200 thousand dollars. In 2016, the film project became the winner of the ninth pitching of Derzhkino, where the film received 15 bln rubles of state budget funds. Eventually, on the Coco Best Pitch Award and the Coco Producers Network Award, the film received an additional €1,500,000 In March 2018, it became known that in 2017, the film also collected more than Ł1.1 million (40,000 Swiss francs) on the Swiss wingfanging platform "wemakeit.com". Kyivstar, an unnamed Fund and TRK Ukraine joined the film to finance the film.

Preparation for filming 
In February 2013, Ukrainian director Yaroslav Lodyhin informed that he, along with writer Serhiy Zhadan, began preparing for the adaptation of the novel "Voroshylovhrad". Initially, the cost of the film should have been from ₴500 thousand to ₴1 million. Negotiations with investors were held in Ukraine and abroad. For some time there was an idea to create a series of 4–8 series mini-series based on the novel, which would begin in 2014 in the basement of the SBU, where the investigator tried to find out what the heroes were doing during the occupation of the city. However, they rejected this idea, because a different story was already coming out.

Filming and post-production 
The film began on July 31, 2017, in Starobilsk, the hometown of Serhiy Zhadan, in which events are described in the novel. Filming the tape in Starobilsk lasted a little more than a month, then continued in Kyiv and ended at the end of September 2017. [16] After the filming, the installation of the tape began until the spring of 2018. On September 4, 2018, producers presented a finished ribbon Derzhkino.

The language of the film 
Most of the film's characters spoke a mixture of Ukrainian and Russian (surzhyk). "The Wild Fields" became the second full-length film in the history of Ukrainian cinema, after the film Assumption (2017), where almost all the actors speak surzhyk. Directed by Yaroslav Lodyhin, he decided to shoot the film. According to Lodyhin, "most heroes will speak [...] a surzhik. People with higher education will speak pure Ukrainian or pure Russian, but since the number of such heroes is small, then most will speak surzhyk. " Lodyhin also noted that himself Starobilsk [where the action takes place] is surrounded by Ukrainian-speaking villages, where there is a huge amount of surzhyk .

Soundtrack 
Most of the musical themes in the film were written by composer and famous pianist Fima Chupakhin. Oleg Kadanov, well known for the projects "Chek Orchestra" and "Mantra Kerouak", took part in the creation of music for the film.

Songs 

 Zahar May - "Supchyk"; - in Russian
 "Alliance" band - "Na zare"; - in Russian
 "Mantra Kerouaca" band - "Buddha"; - in Ukrainian
 «Brudni» band - «Lyshylasya odna»; - in Ukrainian
 «DakhaBrakha» band - «Tataryn-bratko»; - in Ukrainian
 «Orkestr Che» band - «Boh seryoznyy cholovik». - in Ukrainian
 "Ricchi e Poveri" band - "Piccolo Amore"; - in Italian

Acoustic compositions (without words) 

 «Acoustic Quartet» band - «Khomyak»;

Release 
On July 12, 2018, the team presented the first official trailer of the movie "The Wild Fields".

Originally, it was planned that the film will be released in a wide Ukrainian rental on October 11, 2018, but later the premiere was postponed to November 8, 2018. The official partners of the film were "Kyivstar", "Media Group Ukraine" / TRK Ukraina and Derzhkino.

Reception 
The film received mostly mediocre feedback from Ukrainian film critics, and as the film critic Yaroslav Pidhora-Gvyazdovsky noted, "The Wild Fields" turned out to be just a mediocre film "not a discovery, but a failure." In his review of Diana Kurishko's film from BBC News Ukraine noted that after the premiere of "The Wild Fields," he collected controversial comments from both spectators and film critics. "

Despite the fact that the vast majority of Ukrainian film critics rated "The Wild Fields" as a mediocre film, a certain number of film critics had a radically opposite view of the film and responded very favorably to it. Those film critics who responded more positively about the tape called one of the greatest virtues of the film a very qualitative performance by Serhiy Mykhalchuk (cinematography) and a colorful description of the life of Donbas.

References

External links 
 
 “The Wild Fields” is presented for the Winter Film Market / MGU
 “WILD PITCH”: FIRST UKRAINIAN WESTERN ON THE CULT NOVEL BY ZHADAN – 24 CHANNEL / THE KOZ TELEGRAM
 THE FILM “WILD FIELD” ON THE NOVEL BY ZHADAN, OUT ON THE WIDE SCREEN: CANDID INTERVIEWS WITH WRITER – 24 CHANNEL /THE KOZ TELEGRAM
 The film “the Wild Field” has received a great success at the box office

2018 films
Ukrainian comedy-drama films
Ukrainian-language films
2010s Russian-language films